The 2021 European Curling Championships were held in September and November 2021, to qualify European curling teams for the 2022 World Curling Championships and World Qualification Event. The A and B division competitions were held from November 20 to 27 in Lillehammer, Norway. The C division competition was held from September 12 to 17 in Geneva, Switzerland.

The top eight men's teams qualified for the 2022 World Men's Curling Championship. The host of the qualifier (Finland) and the remaining team in the A division as well as the top three teams in the B division qualified for the 2022 World Qualification Event.

The top seven women's teams qualified for the 2022 World Women's Curling Championship. The next two teams in the A division and top two teams in the B division, not including the hosts, Finland, who automatically qualify, qualified for the 2022 World Qualification Event.

Medalists

Men

A division

Teams
The teams are listed as follows:

Round-robin standings
Final round-robin standings

Round-robin results

All draw times are listed in Central European Time (UTC+01:00).

Draw 1
Saturday, November 20, 14:00

Draw 2
Sunday, November 21, 9:00

Draw 3
Sunday, November 21, 19:00

Draw 4
Monday, November 22, 12:00

Draw 5
Monday, November 22, 20:00

Draw 6
Tuesday, November 23, 14:00

Draw 7
Wednesday, November 24, 9:00

Draw 8
Wednesday, November 24, 19:00

Draw 9
Thursday, November 25, 12:00

Playoffs

Semifinal 1
Friday, November 26, 9:00

Semifinal 2
Friday, November 26, 13:30

Bronze medal game
Saturday, November 27, 9:00

Gold medal game
Saturday, November 27, 17:00

Player percentages
Round Robin only

Final standings

B division

Teams
The teams are listed as follows:

Round-robin standings
Final round-robin standings

Relegation round

Playoffs

Final standings

C division

Teams
The teams are listed as follows:

Round-robin standings
Final round-robin standings

Playoffs

Semifinals
Friday, September 17, 9:00

Bronze medal game
Friday, September 17, 14:30

Gold medal game
Friday, September 17, 14:30

Final standings

Women

A division

Teams
The teams are listed as follows:

Round-robin standings
Final round-robin standings

Round-robin results

All draw times are listed in Central European Time (UTC+01:00).

Draw 1
Saturday, November 20, 9:00

Draw 2
Saturday, November 20, 19:00

Draw 3
Sunday, November 21, 14:00

Draw 4
Monday, November 22, 8:00

Draw 5
Monday, November 22, 16:00

Draw 6
Tuesday, November 23, 9:00

Draw 7
Tuesday, November 23, 19:00

Draw 8
Wednesday, November 24, 14:00

Draw 9
Thursday, November 25, 8:00

Playoffs

Semifinal 1
Thursday, November 25, 16:00

Semifinal 2
Thursday, November 25, 20:00

Bronze medal game
Friday, November 26, 18:00

Gold medal game
Saturday, November 27, 12:30

Player percentages
Round Robin only

Final standings

B division

Teams
The teams are listed as follows:

Round-robin standings
Final round-robin standings

Playoffs

Final standings

C division

Teams
The teams are listed as follows:

Round-robin standings
Final round-robin standings

Playoffs

Semifinal
Friday, September 17, 9:00

Gold medal game
Friday, September 17, 14:30

Final standings

Notes

References

External links
 (A division)
 (B division)
 (C division)
 (A division)
 (A division)
 (B division)
 (B division)
 (C division)
 (C division)

European Curling Championships
European Curling Championships
International sports competitions hosted by Norway
International sports competitions hosted by Switzerland
European Curling Championships
European Curling Championships
Curling in Norway
Curling in Switzerland
European Curling Championships
Sports competitions in Geneva 
European Curling Championships